HH1 or HH-1 may refer to:
 HH-1 Huey, a military helicopter
 PRR HH1, a steam locomotive
 Sindlinger HH-1 Hawker Hurricane, a homebuilt aircraft
 Tetulomab (HH1), an experimental cancer drug
 HH 1, the first Herbig-Haro object identified